Mary Sharpe may refer to:
 Mary Elizabeth Sharpe, American philanthropist, businesswoman, and self-taught landscape architect 
 Mary Ann Sharpe, British artist

See also
 Mary Sharp, British abolitionist